Lipki Wielkie  is a village in the administrative district of Gmina Santok, within Gorzów County, Lubusz Voivodeship, in western Poland.

The village has a population of 1,200.

References

Lipki Wielkie